Owen Witte (born May 17, 1949) is an American physician-scientist at the University of California, Los Angeles. He is a distinguished professor of microbiology, immunology and molecular genetics in the David Geffen School of Medicine at UCLA, founding director of the UCLA Eli and Edythe Broad Center of Regenerative Medicine and Stem Cell Research, and the UC Regents’ David Saxon Presidential Chair in developmental immunology (1989–present). Witte is also a Howard Hughes Medical Institute investigator (1986–present) and a member of the President's Cancer Panel (2012 to present). He also served on the Life Sciences jury for the Infosys Prize in 2013.

Witte's research has contributed to the understanding of human leukemias, immune disorders and stem cell activity in cancers of the epithelium. His discovery of the tyrosine kinase activity in the ABL1 protein and the demonstration of the BCR-ABL oncoproteins in leukemias was one of the preclinical discoveries that led to the development of Gleevec, the first targeted therapy for chronic myelogenous leukemia.

Witte also co-discovered the gene for Bruton's tyrosine kinase, a protein essential for normal B-lymphocyte development that, when mutated, causes the onset of X-linked agammaglobulinemia. This finding influenced the development of targeted drugs like Ibrutinib to treat leukemia and lymphoma.

Witte's current research focuses on characterizing the stem cells for epithelial cancers of the prostate and other organs in order to define new and more targeted therapies. Using tissue modeling techniques, Witte discovered the prostate stem cell antigen that is up-regulated in prostate cancer, identified the human prostate stem cell population and determined that the protein N-Myc, which is produced by the gene MYCN, leads to the development of aggressive neuroendocrine prostate cancer tumors.

Education 
Witte earned his B.S. degree in microbiology from Cornell University in 1971. He earned his M.D. degree from Stanford University in 1976, specializing in molecular virology, immunology and medicine.

He completed his predoctoral fellowship in the laboratory of Irving Weissman (Stanford University; 1971 to 1976) and his postdoctoral fellowship in the laboratory of Nobel laureate Dr. David Baltimore (MIT; 1976 to 1980).

Awards 

 1990                Milken Family Medical Foundation Award in Basic Cancer Research
 1991                Richard and Hinda Rosenthal Foundation Award of the American Association for Cancer Research
 1993                William Dameshek Prize, American Society of Hematology
 1996                Elected fellow of the American Academy of Arts and Sciences
 1997                Elected member of the National Academy of Sciences
 2000                Warren Alpert Foundation Prize
 2003                Elected member of the Institute of Medicine
 2003                Leukemia and Lymphoma Society's de Villiers International Achievement Award
 2009                Cotlove Award, Academy of Clinical Laboratory Physicians & Scientists
 2012-2017       Appointed member of the President's Cancer Panel
 2014                Elected Fellow of the American Association for Cancer Research Academy
 2014                The Rowley Prize awarded by the Intl Chronic Myeloid Leukemia Foundation
 2015                American Association for Cancer Research G.H.A. Clowes Memorial Award 
 2016                 University Professor by University of California Regents

References

Living people
1949 births
American immunologists
People from Brooklyn
Cornell University alumni
Stanford University School of Medicine alumni
David Geffen School of Medicine at UCLA faculty
Howard Hughes Medical Investigators
Fellows of the AACR Academy
Scientists from New York (state)
Members of the National Academy of Medicine